Nicholas Heyne (born 22 July 1990) is a former Australian rules footballer who played for  and  in the Australian Football League (AFL).

Playing career

2009-11: Career with St Kilda
Heyne was recruited from Gippsland Power with a third round pick, 48th overall, in the 2008 AFL Draft.

Heyne spent most of his first season playing with St Kilda's  team Sandringham. He made his AFL debut in Round 8 of the 2010 season against Essendon. He played two more matches for the remainder of the season.

Heyne was delisted by the St Kilda Football Club after the 2011 season.

2012: Career with Carlton
He trained with the Carlton Football Club in the 2012 pre-season, before being recruited as a rookie with a second-round pick in the 2012 Rookie Draft. He spent one season on the Carlton rookie list, and was delisted at the end of 2012 without playing a game.

2013–present: Career with Ainsile (NEAFL)
In 2013, Heyne joined Ainslie in the North East Australian Football League.

References

External links 

St Kilda Football Club Official Website – Player Profile.
St Kilda Football Club Official Website – Draftee Profile
Yahoo7! Sport

Living people
1990 births
St Kilda Football Club players
Sandringham Football Club players
Australian rules footballers from Victoria (Australia)
Gippsland Power players
Ainslie Football Club players
People from Orbost
Preston Football Club (VFA) players